Kraynovka is a rural locality (a selo) and the administrative centre of Kraynovsky Selsoviet, Kizlyarsky District, Republic of Dagestan, Russia. The population was 1,213 as of 2010. There are 6 streets.

Geography 
Kraynovka is located 63 km northeast of Kizlyar (the district's administrative centre) by road. Kollektivizator and Imeni Magomeda Gadzhiyeva are the nearest rural localities.

Nationalities 
Russians, Avars, Dargins and Nogais live there.

References 

Rural localities in Kizlyarsky District